Glen E. Brown (born April 15, 1943) is an American former politician in the state of Utah. He served in the Utah House of Representatives from 1977 to 1992, during which time he served stints as majority whip, majority leader, and Speaker of the House. Brown is a dairy farmer, having received a bachelor's degree in animal husbandry from Utah State University in 1966. Prior to serving in the state house, he was the Summit County, Utah Republican party chairman.

References

Living people
1943 births
Members of the Utah House of Representatives